Adolph Fredrik Ture Oskarsson Cederström (25 October 1886 – 7 September 1982) was a Swedish sport shooter who competed in the 1912 Summer Olympics.

He was born in Visby, Gotland, and died in Uppsala.

In 1912 he finished eighth in the 100 metre running deer, single shots event.

References

1886 births
1982 deaths
Swedish male sport shooters
Running target shooters
Olympic shooters of Sweden
Shooters at the 1912 Summer Olympics
Sportspeople from Gotland County